Military march may refer to:
March (music), a musical genre
Military step, a regular, ordered and synchronized walking of military formations
"Military march" (anthem), the national anthem of the Belarusian Democratic Republic that existed from 1918−1919
Military march (Bruckner), composed by Anton Bruckner in 1865